The Fred Waring Show is an American old-time radio musical variety program. It was broadcast in a variety of time slots from February 8, 1933, until October 4, 1957, and was heard at different times on ABC, CBS, NBC, and the Blue Network. The program was sometimes called Chesterfield Time or Pleasure Time.

Musician Fred Waring starred in the shows, which featured his orchestra and chorus. An article in the trade publication Broadcasting described Waring's programs on radio (and later on television) as featuring "friendly banter with his crew, plus renditions of old-time favorite songs and ballads by the chorus and vocalists."

The program's producers through the years included Tom Bennett. Announcers included Paul Douglas and Bill Bivens.

Waring's programs were usually broadcast from the Shawnee Inn in Shawnee on Delaware, Pennsylvania, a facility that he acquired and renamed, transforming the venue into the center of his musical activities.

Versions
Waring's broadcasts were heard on the schedule shown in the table below.

Source: On the Air: The Encyclopedia of Old-Time Radio

Transcriptions for Ford
In 1935, Ford Motor Company used transcriptions from Waring's CBS broadcasts to promote the new 1935 Ford V8 automobile. The World Broadcasting System produced three 15-minute transcriptions for distribution to 300 radio stations vial local Ford dealers.

Those transcriptions were key in establishing a musical artist's legal rights with regard to recordings of performances. In 1939, A United States District court in North Carolina granted Waring an injunction against using a transcription without his authorization. Waring had sued Richard Austin Dunlea, who owned radio station WMFD in Wilmington, North Carolina, after the station broadcast an excerpt from a transcription despite the station's not being designated for use of the transcription. Judge Isaac M. Meekins' ruling said, in part: "Complainant has a property right in his performance. Complainant by mental labor creates something which is the subject of sale ... It is his work, his property ..."

The ruling in North Carolina followed a similar decision in Pennsylvania, in which a state court said that radio station WDAS had to have Waring's permission to broadcast recordings that he had made.

References

External links

Logs
Log of The Fred Waring Show from Jerry Haendiges Vintage Radio Logs
Log of The Fred Waring Show from Old Time Radio Researchers Group
Log of Fred Waring and The Pennsylvanians from radioGOLDINdex
Log of Fred Waring and His Pennsylvanians from radioGOLDINdex 
Log of The Fred Waring Show  from radioGOLDINdex

Streaming
Episodes of The Fred Waring Show from Dumb.com
Episodes of The Fred Waring Show from Old Time Radio Researchers Group Library
Episodes of The Fred Waring Show from Zoot Radio

1933 radio programme debuts
1957 radio programme endings
ABC radio programs
CBS Radio programs
NBC radio programs
NBC Blue Network radio programs
American music radio programs
1930s American radio programs
1940s American radio programs
1950s American radio programs